Sagmeister is a surname shared by several people:
 Franz Sagmeister (born 1974), German Olympic bobsledder
 Michael Sagmeister (born 1959), German jazz guitarist
 Mojca Sagmeister (born 1996), Slovenian swimmer
 Stefan Sagmeister (born 1962), Austrian-American graphic designer and typographer